Fossa may refer to:

Animals
 Fossa (animal), the common name of a carnivoran mammal of genus Cryptoprocta endemic to Madagascar
 Fossa, the Latin genus name of the Malagasy civet, a related but smaller mammal endemic to Madagascar

Places
 Fossa, Abruzzo, a town in Italy
 Fossa, County Kerry, a townland in Ireland
 Fossa More, a townland in the parish of Tomgraney, County Clare
 Fossa Beg, a townland in the parish of Tomgraney, County Clare
 Fossá, Faroe Islands, an abandoned village
 Fossá, a waterfall in the Faroe islands
 Fossa (river), Iceland

Other uses
 Fossa (anatomy), a depression in part of the body
 Fossa (geology), a depression in a planet
 La Fossa, an Italian rap group
 Fossa (drowning pit): for executions

See also
 Fosse (disambiguation)
 Fossato (disambiguation)